Amfreville is a commune in the Calvados department in the Normandy region of north-western France.

The inhabitants of the commune are known as Amfrevillais or Amfrevillaises

Geography
Amfreville is located some 25 km north-west of Caen and 1 km south-east of Ouistreham mostly on the right bank of the Orne with a small portion on the left bank. It can be accessed by the D514 from Sallenelles in the north passing through the west of the commune then continuing south then west to Bénouville. Access to the village is by the D37B from Breville-les-Monts in the south-east and continuing through the village north to Sallenelles. There is also the D236 going east from the village to Bavent. There are several hamlets apart from the village: Hameau Oger and Hameau La Rue form a continuous urban area with the main village and the hamlets of La Basse Ecarde and La Haute Ecarde are to the west. The rest of the commune and the entire left bank of the Orne portion are farmland.

The Orne river separates the two parts of the commune with no direct access across the river - the nearest crossing is on the D514 to the south of the commune. A stream forms the northern border of the commune flowing into the Orne.

History

Amfreville is located close to Sword Beach on the Normandy coast, which is one of the beaches where the Allies executed their Normandy landings. It is also close to the important medieval city of Caen, which figured in the Allied landings. Amfreville is considered to have been officially "liberated" from the German occupation of World War II on 6 June 1944.

Amfreville is understood to be the ancestral home of the Umfraville family of Anglo-Norman nobles who occupied England under William the Conqueror and his successors, and went on to become British nobility under the titles the Barons of Prudhoe and the Lords of Redesdale, and later also gained Scottish lands and the title Earl of Angus.

Images of these historical associations with the Norman Conquest of 1066 and the Normandy Landings of 1944 are incorporated in the town's heraldry.

Heraldry

Administration

List of Successive Mayors

Twinning

Amfreville has twinning associations with:
 Hillerse (Germany) since 1999.
 Brunehaut (Belgium) since 2005.
 Dolton (United Kingdom) since 1981.

Population

Sites and monuments

Le Plain is a place with a tree plantation, a church, and horses. It is registered as a site of ecological interest for flora and fauna.

See also
Communes of the Calvados department

Bibliography
Amfréville en Baie de l'Orne, Gillonne and Rémi Desquesnes, 2001

References

External links
Amfreville on Géoportail, National Geographic Institute (IGN) website 
Amfreville on the 1750 Cassini Map

Communes of Calvados (department)